Frozen Charlotte can refer to several things:

 Fair Charlotte, a popular folk ballad inspired by an 1843 cautionary poem by Seba Smith.
 Frozen Charlotte, a 19th-century doll named after the above.
 Frozen Charlotte is a song on Natalie Merchant's 1998 album Ophelia.
 Frozen Charlotte is the title of Dollshead's full-length debut LP released April 7, 1998.
 Frozen Charlottes is a short story by Lucy Sussex that was nominated for the 2004 Ditmar Awards
 Frozen Charlotte Glacé is an ice-cream pudding from Fannie Farmer's Boston Cooking-School Cook Book.